Maasdriel is a municipality in the province of Gelderland, in the eastern Netherlands.

Maasdriel was formed on 1 January, 1999 by the merger of the former municipalities of Ammerzoden (including Well, Wellseind en Wordragen), Hedel, Heerewaarden, Maasdriel (Alem, Hoenzadriel, Kerkdriel and Velddriel) and Rossum (including Hurwenen). The former municipality of Maasdriel was called "Driel" before 1944.

Populated places

Topography

Dutch Topographic map of the municipality of Maasdriel, June 2015

Notable people 
 Johannes Zwijsen (1794 in Kerkdriel – 1877) Roman Catholic Archbishop of Utrecht
 Jacobus Groenendaal (1805 in Heerewaarden – 1860) a South African statesman
 Johannes Hubertus Leonardus de Haas (1832 in Hedel – 1908) a Dutch animal and landscape painter of the Hague School 
 Hendrik van der Veen (1888 in Rossum – 1977) a Dutch missionary worker and linguist who worked in Tana Toraja, Dutch East Indies. 
 Thijs de Graauw (born 1942 in Kerkdriel) a Dutch astronomer
 Boet van Dulmen (born 1948 in Ammerzoden) a Dutch former Grand Prix motorcycle road racer

Gallery

References

External links

Official website

 
Municipalities of Gelderland